The annual migration of red crabs in Australia begins in October/November each year. Millions of red crabs migrate from the Australian islands to the Indian Ocean during this one to two-week-long period. The purpose of migration is to go underwater and lay eggs and breeding has to be made possible. During this migration season, the routes of arrival and departure of crabs are closed with barriers so that they can be protected from any kind of damage.

References

External links
 Red crab migration by parksaustralia.gov.au

Fauna of Christmas Island
Animal migration
October events
November events